The 2018 Swedish Open was the eleventh event of the 2018 ITTF World Tour. The event was organised by the Swedish Table Tennis Association, under the authority of the International Table Tennis Federation (ITTF). It took place from 1–4 November in Stockholm, Sweden.

Men's singles

Seeds

Draw

Top half

Bottom half

Finals

Women's singles

Seeds

Draw

Top half

Bottom half

Finals

Men's doubles

Seeds

Draw

Women's doubles

Seeds

Draw

References

External links
Tournament page on ITTF website

Swedish Open
Swedish Open (table tennis)
Table tennis competitions in Sweden
International sports competitions hosted by Sweden
Swedish Open (table tennis)